Annie Pietri (born 23 October 1956 in 14th arrondissement) is a French writer. She wrote the novel The orange trees of Versailles Delacorte Press/Random House (2004).

External links
Official website
Randomhouse

French women writers
1956 births
Living people
Writers from Paris
21st-century French women writers